Cyperus pustulatus is a species of sedge that is native to tropical parts of Africa.

The species was first formally described by the botanist Martin Vahl in 1805.

See also 
 List of Cyperus species

References 

pustulatus
Taxa named by Martin Vahl
Plants described in 1805
Flora of Angola
Flora of Benin
Flora of Burkina Faso
Flora of Cameroon
Flora of the Central African Republic
Flora of Cambodia
Flora of Chad
Flora of Ethiopia
Flora of Gabon
Flora of the Gambia
Flora of Ghana
Flora of Guinea
Flora of Ivory Coast
Flora of Liberia
Flora of Mali
Flora of Mozambique
Flora of Nigeria
Flora of Rwanda
Flora of Senegal
Flora of Sudan
Flora of Tanzania
Flora of Togo
Flora of Uganda